María José Martínez Sánchez was the defending champion, but chose to compete in the 2010 Dubai Tennis Championships instead.Mariana Duque Mariño won in the final 6–4, 6–3, against Angelique Kerber.

Seeds

Draw

Finals

Top half

Bottom half

External links
Main Draw Singles
Qualifying Draw

Copa Sony Ericsson Colsanitas - Singles
Copa Colsanitas